VMM may refer to:

Computing
 Virtual memory, manager
 The Windows 9x Virtual Machine Manager (see VMM32)
 Virtual Machine Manager or Virtual Machine Monitor (see Hypervisor)
 VAX VMM, an unreleased hypervisor for Digital's VAX hardware.
 The RedHat Virtual Machine Manager
 Verification Methodology Manual (see Reference Verification Methodology)
 vmm: a native hypervisor on OpenBSD
 The .vmm file type, used for 3D movies

Other
 Value measuring methodology in Project Management and Governance
 Vodafone McLaren Mercedes, a motor racing team based England best known as a Formula One constructor
 Vlaamse Media Maatschappij, a Belgian commercial radio and television provider
 Virginia Mennonite Missions
 common abbreviation for the Middle Magdalena Valley in Colombia